Blackfriars, derived from Black Friars, a common name for the Dominican Order of friars, may refer to:

England
 Blackfriars, Bristol, a former priory in Bristol
 Blackfriars, Canterbury, a former monastery in Kent
 Blackfriars, Gloucester, a former priory in Gloucestershire
 Blackfriars, Greater Manchester, an inner city area of Salford
 Blackfriars, Leicester, a former Dominican Friary in Leicestershire
 Blackfriars, London, site of a former priory in the City of London
 Blackfriars, Newcastle upon Tyne, a former priory in Tyne and Wear
 Blackfriars, Oxford, a Dominican priory and Hall of the University of Oxford, Oxfordshire
 Cambridge Blackfriars, a Dominican priory
 Derby Blackfriars, a former priory in Derbyshire
 Exeter Blackfriars, a former priory in Devon
 Ipswich Blackfriars, a former priory in Suffolk

Scotland
 Blackfriars, Montrose, a former priory at Montrose, Scotland
 Blackfriars, Perth, a former priory at Perth, Scotland

Other uses

Australia
 Blackfriars Priory School, a Dominican school in Prospect, South Australia

England
 Blackfriars station, a railway station in the City of London
 Blackfriars Theatre, the name of two theatres which once stood in London
 Blackfriars Arts Centre, an arts centre in Boston, England
 Blackfriars Bridge, a bridge over the River Thames in London
 Blackfriars Bridge, Manchester, a bridge over the River Irwell in Manchester
 Blackfriars Bridge railway station a former London railway station named after the London bridge.
 New Blackfriars, a theological journal formerly called Blackfriars

Scotland
 Blackfriars, the name of a house at Robert Gordon's College, Aberdeen

Elsewhere
 Blackfriars Playhouse, the American Shakespeare Center's theatre in Staunton, Virginia